Jakob Jonas Björnståhl (January 23, 1731 in Rotarbo – July 11, 1779 in Thessaloniki), Swedish orientalist and Greek philologist from the Lund University. He was a manuscript collector (minuscule 901, minuscule 902, and minuscule 1852).

References

External links 
 Björnståhl, Jakob Jonas Nordisk familjebok

1731 births
1779 deaths
Swedish orientalists
Philologists